Kwanbuk is a region in North Hamgyong Province of North Korea.  The region may once have been occupied by the Okjeo people. It was later controlled by Goguryeo and then Balhae, and subsequently contested by Goryeo and the Jin dynasty.

Its literal meaning is "North of the Ridge", the ridge (Korean, kwan) in question being Mach'ŏnnyŏng (Chosŏn'gŭl: 마천령, Hancha: 摩天嶺).   

The term Kwanbuk is no longer widely used.

See also
Eight Provinces of Korea
Geography of North Korea

Regions of Korea
Geography of North Korea